Nicholas Ryan Allen (born October 8, 1998) is an American professional baseball shortstop and second baseman for the Oakland Athletics of Major League Baseball (MLB). He made his MLB debut in 2022.

Amateur career
Allen attended Francis Parker School in San Diego, California, where he played baseball. During his freshman year, he committed to play college baseball at the University of Southern California. As a junior in 2016, he slashed .469/.570/.816. In 2017, his senior year, Allen hit .297 with two home runs, ten doubles, and 23 stolen bases. For his high school career, he had a fielding percentage of .963. After his senior year, he was selected by the Oakland Athletics in the third round of the 2017 Major League Baseball draft. He signed for $2 million.

Professional career
After signing with Oakland, Allen made his professional debut with the Rookie-level Arizona League Athletics, hitting .254 with one home run and 14 RBIs over 35 games. Allen spent the 2018 season with the Beloit Snappers of the Class A Midwest League with whom he batted .239 with 34 RBIs and 24 stolen bases over 121 games. In 2019, he began the year with the Stockton Ports of the Class A-Advanced California League with whom he was named an All-Star. He was placed on the injured list in late June after suffering a leg injury, and missed the remainder of the season. Over 72 games with Stockton, he slashed .292/.363/.434 with three home runs, 25 RBIs, and 13 stolen bases. He was selected to play in the Arizona Fall League for the Mesa Solar Sox following the season. He did not play a minor league game in 2020 due to the cancellation of the minor league season caused by the COVID-19 pandemic.

To begin the 2021 season, Allen was assigned to the Midland RockHounds of the Double-A Central. He was placed on the temporarily inactive list twice during the season while participating in Olympic competition. After returning from the Olympics in mid-August, Allen was promoted to the Las Vegas Aviators of the Triple-A West. Over 89 games played between the two clubs, Allen slashed .288/.346/.403 with six home runs, 41 RBIs, and 12 stolen bases. On November 19, 2021, Oakland selected Allen's contract and added him to their 40-man roster. He returned to Las Vegas to begin the 2022 season.

On April 18, 2022, Allen was added to Oakland's roster as a COVID-related substitute. He made his major league debut the next day as the starting second baseman. On April 22, Allen collected his first career hit, a single off of Baltimore Orioles reliever Dillon Tate.

International career
 
Allen competed for a spot on the United States national baseball team in advance of the 2020 Summer Olympics and was subsequently named to the roster of the national team for the Americas Qualifying Event. After the national team qualified, he was named to the Olympics roster on July 2. Following the Olympic competition, during which the United States won a silver medal, Allen was named Best Defensive Player. For the tournament, he batted .286 with three extra-base hits.

Personal
Allen is engaged to Savannah Boone, daughter of former professional baseball player Bret Boone.

References

External links

Living people
1998 births
Baseball players from San Diego
Major League Baseball infielders
Oakland Athletics players
Arizona League Athletics players
Beloit Snappers players
Stockton Ports players
Mesa Solar Sox players
Midland RockHounds players
Las Vegas Aviators players
United States national baseball team players
Baseball players at the 2020 Summer Olympics
Olympic baseball players of the United States
Medalists at the 2020 Summer Olympics
Olympic silver medalists for the United States in baseball